Rok Možič (born 17 January 2002) is a Slovenian volleyball player who plays for the Italian team Verona Volley and the Slovenian national team.

Career

Club
Možič started playing volleyball at the age of 7 in the youth teams of OK Maribor. In 2021, he won the Slovenian Championship with Maribor, having beaten ACH Volley in the finals.

In the summer of 2021, Možič signed his first contract abroad with the Italian team Verona Volley.

National team
Možič made his maiden appearance for the Slovenian national team at the age of 17 at the European Qualifying Tournament for the 2020 Olympic Games. In 2021, the Slovenian national team, including Možič, made it to the final of the European Championship, where they lost to Italy.

Personal life
Both his parents were volleyball players. His father, Peter Možič, is a volleyball coach.

Honours

Club
 National championships
 2020–21  Slovenian Championship, with Merkur Maribor

Youth national team
 Beach volleyball
 2018  CEV U18 European Championship, with Rok Bračko
 2021  CEV U20 European Championship, with Rok Bračko

References

External links

 
 Player profile at LegaVolley.it 
 Player profile at Volleybox.net

2002 births
Living people
Sportspeople from Maribor
Slovenian men's volleyball players
Slovenian expatriate sportspeople in Italy
Expatriate volleyball players in Italy
Outside hitters